Astur is a decorative  typeface that was designed in 1940 and licensed by the Spanish foundry Nacional Typefoundry. The letters appear to be made of wooden planks, and it is often used when an outdoor or camping look is desired. The font's name, a reference to the ancient inhabitants of northern Spain (the Astures), is meant to underline its rustic appearance.

A common software version of the font is called "Woodplank".

Display typefaces
Letterpress typefaces
Digital typefaces
Typefaces and fonts introduced in 1940